The Dhanuk is an ethnic group found in India. In Bihar where they are significantly present, they have been categorised as the "lower backwards", along with several other caste constituting 32% of state's population.  In recent times they have been identifying themselves with the Kurmi caste along with the Mahto of Chhotanagpur. In Bihar, they are considered as a sub-caste of the Mandal caste and are often found using Mandal surname. In recent times, there has been attempt to forge a socio-political alliance between them and the twin castes of Koeri and the Kurmi, as a part of Luv-Kush equation.

Distribution
Dhanuks are found in the Indian states of Bihar, Haryana, Rajasthan and Uttar Pradesh. Dhanka people in Rajasthan claim that their name is a variant and they are the same community. However, the veracity of this claim is extremely difficult to ascertain due to the numerous other claims. Their claim sometimes seems contradictory to the Madheshi people who are found in Terai Nepal. The state has a community called Dhanuk or Dhanushk, whose traditional occupation was watchmen.

Culture and tradition

Oral traditions
Like many other aspirational communities of India, the Dhanuk community also embarked upon the path of Sanskritisation by tracing their community hero in epic and historic figures. This made them find their community hero in Panna Dhai, the maid of Uday Singh's mother in the Mewar who sacrificed her own son Chandan to save the life of her infant master. The legend of Panna Dhai has become a popular glory tale among the members of Dhanuk caste particularly in some selected pockets of Uttar Pradesh. The community – which is distributed in Kanpur, Ettawah, Farrukhabad, Manipuri and nearby areas – celebrates the anniversary of the Panna Dhai. According to social historian Badri Narayan, the legends of Panna gives the untouchable community a cause to consolidate their "caste identity".

Tracing own identity
Anthropologist Megan Moodie narrates the caste history of Dhanuks, who are known by different names such as Dhanka, Dhanak and Dhanakiya in different parts of India, through a pamphlet published by the community itself. According to their own accounts Dhanuk people claim that they have special position among all castes and trace the origin of the history of the word "Dhanak" from the scriptures like Rig Veda and Puranas. The community history claims that they were warring tribes who used to wear Dhanush (Bow and arrow) in the ancient past. In the medieval period they claim to have helped the Rajput kings in the fight against Mughals. Consequently, with the defeat of Hindu Rajas they were harassed by the other rulers including the Mughals and this led them to migrate to the different parts of country which include present day Himachal Pradesh, Bihar and Uttar Pradesh. 

As described by them, [they] have roots in Rajasthan and several of their customs and tradition have Rajput influence. Some of the customs like taking ring and jewelry of the bride and groom striking ornamental archway reflects the impact of Rajput influence. The Dhanuk people claims that their ancestors in Rajasthan worked upon the bamboo to make bows and arrows, as well as baskets. They also depended upon other minor forest products for their livelihood and widespread deforestation in the later periods left them with no other choice to shift towards other subsistence activities. Those who moved to other states were employed in the grain market and started working as the cleaner of grains (Dhan) and also provided cheap labour to transport it from the market to its destination. Presumably, the association with the grain market brought them the name with which they were known later. Further, the occupational diversity in Dhanuks was much more pronounced than the other caste who were fixed in a predetermined Varnasharma set up. The Dhanuks and the other associated subcastes also claim to have worked as water carriers, musicians, guards, shepherds and agricultural labourers. 

This claim is also supported by the accounts of William Crooke, who in his book Caste and Tribes of Northwestern India describes Dhanuks as people working as water carriers, guards and musicians in marriages. Crooke also reveals several other synonyms used to describe this caste as Dhankara, Katheriya, Kedi and Ravar. Bushman has described them as Martial race while Ispel has described them as "Dhanush wielding people", who later converted into guards, hunters and weavers. Some people also think that Dhanak was a Rishi and his followers were later known as Dhanka/Dhanuk.

In India

Bihar 
The Dhanuk of Bihar are deemed to be an Other Backward Class in India's reservation system.
In the early phase of history this cast was said to be a warrior caste. They are frontliner warrior who used bow and arrow as their weapon. But the consequent defeat in a series of wars forced them into slavery and forced them to be engaged in different kinds of occupation. Because they had not enough land, they started work as agricultural labourers.

In the 19th century, Dhanuks were among the communities of the region whose landless members were employed as agricultural labourers. Such labourers were considered as slaves under the kamia system and were often referred to as Jotiyas. The Dhanuks had largely escaped the system towards the end of the century. Many of the former slave workers took up lowly positions in the industries and commerce of the developing towns, aided by improvements in transport, but were ultimately no better off either economically or socially.

Haryana 
The Dhanak of Haryana, also known as Delu (who become Bishnoi in 800 BC), is a community of weavers. They have been granted Scheduled Caste status in the reservation system, and are found throughout the state.

Uttar Pradesh 
In Uttar Pradesh, Dhanuks are given Scheduled Caste status and at the time of the 2011 Census of India, their population was 651,355 people.

There is some ambiguity in the use of the term dhanuk in the state. As per some scholars, this cast was largely associated with the scheduled tribe Bhil. However, some scholars, like Professor Susan Wadley, have described the Dhanuk as a "midwife caste". Janet Chawla has noted that using the term for midwives and people who work with trash "highlights the idea that birth-related work, indeed vitally important body work, and trash work can be part of the same matrix of tasks".

Sarah Pinto, an anthropologist has noted that most people are engaged in agricultural work. She believes that there is an "overidentification of caste with iconic labour", and being more a reflection of the worldviews of both Brahmins and the later British colonisers than of reality.

References 

Scheduled Tribes of Maharashtra
Scheduled Tribes of Rajasthan
Scheduled Tribes of Madhya Pradesh
Scheduled Tribes of Gujarat
Scheduled Tribes of Chhattisgarh
Scheduled Castes of Uttar Pradesh
Scheduled Castes of Haryana
Social groups of Bihar
Ethnic groups in Nepal

External link
Women Heroes and Dalit Assertion in North India: Culture, Identity and Politics